Industrial Relations: A Journal of Economy and Society is a quarterly peer-reviewed economics journal covering industrial relations and labor economics. It was established in 1961 and is published by John Wiley & Sons on behalf of the UC-Berkeley Institute for Research on Labor and Employment, of which it is the official journal. The editor-in-chief is  Alex Bryson (University College London). According to the Journal Citation Reports, the journal has a 2020 impact factor of 2.371, ranking it 15th out of 30 journals in the category "Industrial Relations & Labor".

References

External links

Industrial relations
Economics journals
Publications established in 1961
Quarterly journals
Wiley (publisher) academic journals
English-language journals